John James Bourne (2 November 1872 – 23 December 1952) was an English cricketer who played first-class cricket for Derbyshire in 1898.

Bourne was born at Moira, Leicestershire, the son of Thomas Bourne, a colliery manager  and his wife Rose. They lived at Church Gresley where he was a colliery clerk in 1891.

Bourne, with fellow one-timer William Prince, played one match for Derbyshire in the 1898 season which was against Nottinghamshire in July. He was a left-arm medium-pace bowler and took three wickets in over 40 overs during the match. As a left-handed batsman, he batted for just a single innings in the tailend to make 6 runs.

Bourne died in Burton-on-Trent at the age of 80.

References

1872 births
1952 deaths
English cricketers
Derbyshire cricketers
People from North West Leicestershire District
Cricketers from Leicestershire
People from Church Gresley
Cricketers from Derbyshire